House at 199 Prospect Avenue is a historic home located at Sea Cliff in Nassau County, New York.  It was built about 1890 and is a two-story house with decorative slate jerkinhead roof in the Late Victorian style.  It features a three bay shed roof dormer that forms the second floor and covers the entrance porch. It is identical to the House at 195 Prospect Avenue.

It was listed on the National Register of Historic Places in 1988.

References

Houses on the National Register of Historic Places in New York (state)
Victorian architecture in New York (state)
Houses completed in 1890
Houses in Nassau County, New York
National Register of Historic Places in Nassau County, New York